Kidder Township is one of twelve townships in Caldwell County, Missouri, and is part of the Kansas City metropolitan area with the USA.  As of the 2000 census, its population was 891.

Kidder Township was established in 1867.

Geography
It contains four cemeteries: Cameron Memorial Gardens, Kenney, Kidder and McDaniel.

The streams of East Sheep Creek, Jordan Branch, Long Branch and West Sheep Creek run through this township.

References

External links
 US-Counties.com
 City-Data.com

Townships in Caldwell County, Missouri
Townships in Missouri
1867 establishments in Missouri